The 1967–68 Hong Kong First Division League season was the 57th since its establishment.

League table

References
1967–68 Hong Kong First Division table (RSSSF)

Hong Kong First Division League seasons
Hong
football